The 2017 season is Bangkok Glass's 7th season in the Thai League since 2011, on the name of Bangkok Glass.

Thai League

Thai FA Cup

Thai League Cup

Reserve team in Thai League 4

Bangkok Glass send the reserve team to compete in T4 Bangkok Metropolitan Region as Bangkok Glass B.

Squad goals statistics

Transfers
First Thai footballer's market is opening on December 14, 2016 to January 28, 2017
Second Thai footballer's market is opening on June 3, 2017 to June 30, 2017

In

Out

Loan in

Loan out

Notes

References

External links
 Bangkok Glass F.C. Official Website
 Thai League Official Website
 Team data from Thai League Official Website

2017
Bangkok Glass